Apache is a town in Caddo County, Oklahoma, United States. The population was 1,444 at the 2010 census.

History
Before opening the Kiowa, Comanche, and Apache Reservation on August 1, 1901, for unrestricted settlement by non-Indians,  Land Lottery Director William A. Richards had recommended setting aside the land now occupied by Apache as a townsite. He had expected the community would be named "Richards" in his honor. Instead, officials of the Chicago, Rock Island and Pacific Railway (Rock Island) named the community Apache. A land run for lots in Apache was held on August 6, 1901. According to the Encyclopedia of Oklahoma History and Culture, five lumberyards and six saloons opened for business within hours after the run. A tent served as a market for groceries.

An election of the town's first city officials was held in an outdoor meeting on the evening of August 6, 1901. E. E. Blake was elected as mayor and F. E. Richey as city clerk. Appointed officials included I. F. Crow, city attorney, and Sam Wass, city marshal. Apache was incorporated on July 22, 1902.

Geography 
Apache is located at  (34.894638, -98.361371).

Climate

Demographics 

As of the census of 2010, there were 1,444 people living in the town. There were 712 housing units at an average density of 352.0 per square mile (136.1/km2). The racial makeup of the town was 70.79% White, 0.12% African American, 25.12% Native American, 0.25% Asian, 0.06% Pacific Islander, 0.56% from other races, and 3.09% from two or more races. Hispanic or Latino of any race were 3.47% of the population.

There were 646 households, out of which 35.6% had children under the age of 18 living with them, 48.8% were married couples living together, 15.0% had a female householder with no husband present, and 31.1% were non-families. 27.6% of all households were made up of individuals, and 15.2% had someone living alone who was 65 years of age or older. The average household size was 2.50 and the average family size was 3.06.

In the town, the population was spread out, with 29.6% under the age of 18, 9.2% from 18 to 24, 26.1% from 25 to 44, 19.4% from 45 to 64, and 15.7% who were 65 years of age or older. The median age was 34 years. For every 100 females, there were 89.2 males. For every 100 females age 18 and over, there were 84.7 males.

The median income for a household in the town was $26,953, and the median income for a family was $32,431. Males had a median income of $25,391 versus $19,853 for females. The per capita income for the town was $12,790. About 11.4% of families and 16.2% of the population were below the poverty line, including 22.4% of those under age 18 and 9.8% of those age 65 or over.

Economy 
Apache began as an agricultural center, with wheat and cattle as the primary products, and remains that to the present.

Mo Betta western rodeo shirts are made in Apache.

Utilities 
 Apache Public Works Authority provides water, sewer, and sanitation services to the town.
 Electric service is provided by American Electric Power Public Service Company of Oklahoma or CKEnergy Electric Cooperative.
 Natural Gas service is provided by Oklahoma Natural Gas.
 Digital telephone service, and DSL internet is provided by Pioneer Telephone.
 Digital Cable TV service is provided by Southern Plains Cable Company.

Notable people
 Mildred Cleghorn (1910–1997), dollmaker and Apache cultural leader
 Lou Kretlow (1921–2007), Major League Baseball pitcher
 Pascal Poolaw (1922–1967), Native American war hero
 Don Chandler Football coach, who the Football field is named after.

References 

Towns in Caddo County, Oklahoma
Towns in Oklahoma
Populated places established in 1901